Santa Maria Assunta is a Renaissance-style, Roman Catholic parish church located in the town of Arrone, province of Terni, region of Umbria, Italy.

History
The church has a sober 15th-century white marble facade. The interior, including the apse. The interior contains various frescoes, including the following works:
Madonna del Rosario (1609) attributed to Giuseppe Bastiani
Madonna and Child with Saints Peter and John the Evangelist, attributed to Francesco Cozza
Annunciation, Adoration by Shepherds, Dormition of the Virgin, and Coronation of Virgin (1516) by Vincenzo Tamagni and Giovanni di Pietro da Spoleto
Frescoes in the apse (1544) by Jacopo Siculo
The main altar triptych by the Maestro di Arrone (1487) was stolen in 1971.

References

15th-century Roman Catholic church buildings in Italy
Churches in the province of Terni
Renaissance architecture in Umbria